WVAQ is a Contemporary Hit Radio formatted broadcast radio station licensed to Morgantown, West Virginia, serving North Central West Virginia.  WVAQ is owned and operated by West Virginia Radio Corporation.

References

External links
 102 WVAQ Online
 

1948 establishments in West Virginia
Contemporary hit radio stations in the United States
Radio stations established in 1948
VAQ